Imler is an unincorporated community in Bedford County, Pennsylvania, United States. Imler has a post office, with ZIP code 16655.

References

Unincorporated communities in Bedford County, Pennsylvania
Unincorporated communities in Pennsylvania